The 1957–58  Kansas Jayhawks men's basketball team represented the University of Kansas during the 1957–58 college men's basketball season.

Roster
Wilt Chamberlain
Ron Loneski
Bob Billings
Bob Hickman
Al Donaghue
Monte Johnson
Jim Hoffman
Gary Thompson
Lyn Kindred
John Cleland
Jerry Johnson
Gary Mowry
Larry Kelley
Art Muegler

Schedule

References

Kansas Jayhawks men's basketball seasons
Kansas
Kansas
Kansas